In Greek mythology, Nicostratus (Ancient Greek: Νικόστρατος) is a son of Menelaus, king of Mycenaean Sparta. He was known to Hesiod and epic poet Cinaethon. His name means 'Victorious Army' and suggests that his birth came after the Trojan War.

Family 
Nicostratus' mother was either Menelaus' wife Helen of Troy, or a slave. Although in Homer's Odyssey, the only child of Menelaus and Helen is Hermione, other sources also mention a son Nicostratus. The mythographer Apollodorus says that "Menelaus had by Helen a daughter Hermione and, according to some (κατά τινας), a son Nicostratus", while a scholia on Sophocles' Electra quotes Hesiod as saying "She [Helen] bore Hermione to spear-famed Menelaus, and last of all she bore Nicostratus, scion of Ares".

However, according to the geographer Pausanias, Nicostratus, and Megapenthes were sons of Menelaus by a slave, and that because they were illegitimate, Agamemnon's son Orestes succeeded Menelaus as king of Sparta.

One account mentioned that Nicostratus and Aithiolas, two sons of Helen, were worshipped by the Lacedaemonians.

Mythology 
According to the Rhodians, when Orestes was "still wandering" (being chased by the Erinyes because of his killing of his mother Clytemenestra), Nicostratus and Megapenthes drove out Helen, who found refuge on Rhodes with Polyxo.

According to Pausanias, Nicostratus and Megapenthes were depicted, riding a single horse, on the sixth century BC Doric-Ionic temple complex at Amyclae known as the throne of Apollo, designed by Bathycles of Magnesia.

In popular culture
Although Nicostratus does not figure in any ancient account of the Trojan War, he is the central character in The Luck of Troy, a modern retelling of the story by Roger Lancelyn Green.

Notes

References
 Apollodorus, Apollodorus, The Library, with an English Translation by Sir James George Frazer, F.B.A., F.R.S. in 2 Volumes. Cambridge, Massachusetts, Harvard University Press; London, William Heinemann Ltd. 1921. Online version at the Perseus Digital Library.
 Fowler, R. L., Early Greek Mythography: Volume 2: Commentary, Oxford University Press, 2013. .
 Gardner, Ernest Arthur, A Handbook of Greek Sculpture, Macmillan and Co,. Limited, London, 1911.
 Gantz, Timothy, Early Greek Myth: A Guide to Literary and Artistic Sources, Johns Hopkins University Press, 1996, Two volumes:  (Vol. 1),  (Vol. 2).
 Grimal, Pierre, The Dictionary of Classical Mythology, Wiley-Blackwell, 1996. .
 Most, G.W., Hesiod: The Shield, Catalogue of Women, Other Fragments, Loeb Classical Library, No. 503, Cambridge, Massachusetts, Harvard University Press, 2007, 2018. . Online version at Harvard University Press.
 Hard, Robin, The Routledge Handbook of Greek Mythology: Based on H.J. Rose's "Handbook of Greek Mythology", Psychology Press, 2004, . Google Books.
 Parada, Carlos, Genealogical Guide to Greek Mythology, Jonsered, Paul Åströms Förlag, 1993. .
 Pausanias, Pausanias Description of Greece with an English Translation by W.H.S. Jones, Litt.D., and H.A. Ormerod, M.A., in 4 Volumes. Cambridge, Massachusetts, Harvard University Press; London, William Heinemann Ltd. 1918. Online version at the Perseus Digital Library.
 Tripp, Edward, Crowell's Handbook of Classical Mythology, Thomas Y. Crowell Co; First edition (June 1970). .
 West, M. L., Greek Epic Fragments: From the Seventh to the Fifth Centuries BC, edited and translated by Martin L. West, Loeb Classical Library No. 497, Cambridge, Massachusetts, Harvard University Press, 2003.  . Online version at Harvard University Press.

Princes in Greek mythology
Laconian mythology